Maude Astrid Karlén (born 25 November 1932) is a retired Swedish gymnast. She won a silver medal in the team portable apparatus event at the 1956 Summer Olympics.

References

1932 births
Living people
Swedish female artistic gymnasts
Gymnasts at the 1956 Summer Olympics
Olympic gymnasts of Sweden
Olympic silver medalists for Sweden
Olympic medalists in gymnastics
Sportspeople from Stockholm

Medalists at the 1956 Summer Olympics
20th-century Swedish women